Billy Mellors (born 1975) is a Scottish international indoor and lawn bowler.

Bowls career
His finest moment came when he won the silver medal in the pairs with Darren Burnett at the 2008 World Outdoor Bowls Championship in Christchurch.

He won the Scottish National Bowls Championships in 2006 and also won the 2015 Scottish indoor bowls title

References

1975 births
Scottish male bowls players
Living people